Charlton Athletic F.C. is an English association football club based in Charlton in the Royal Borough of Greenwich, London. Since the club's foundation in 1905, they have been managed by 30 different permanent managers. Their longest-serving manager was Jimmy Seed, who held the role for 23 years from 1933 to 1956.

Statistics

References

Managers
 
Charlton Athletic